Audubon Park may refer to a place in the United States:

 Audubon Park Historic District, New York City, in Manhattan
 Audubon Park in New Orleans

Communities:
 Audubon Park, Kentucky
 Audubon Park, Minneapolis, Minnesota
 Audubon Park, New Jersey
 Audubon, New Orleans, Louisiana
 Audubon Park, Tampa, Florida

See also 
 Audubon Zoo, New Orleans